Fredrik Wandrup (born 1 March 1951) is a Norwegian journalist and writer.  He has been affiliated with Dagbladet since 1976, and won the Riksmål Society Literature Prize in 1995.

References
 Om Wandrup ved Gyldendal Norsk Forlag

Norwegian male writers
Norwegian journalists
Norwegian literary critics 
Norwegian biographers 
1955 births
Living people